BPC is the callsign of a time signal broadcasting from the BPC Shangqiu Low-Frequency Time-Code Radio Station, cooperatively constructed by the National Time Service Center of the Chinese Academy of Sciences and Xi’an Gaohua Technology Co., Ltd., since April 25, 2002.

BPC transmits a time signal on 68.5 kHz, which can be used for synchronizing radio controlled clocks. As opposed to other time signal transmitters, the signal format is not published openly; a special license is required.

BPC broadcasts at 90 kW for 20 hours per day, with a 4-hour break from 05:00–09:00 (China Standard Time) daily (21:00–1:00 UTC). BPC includes both conventional amplitude modulated time code and additional spread-spectrum time code, about which little is known.

Time code

References

External links
 低频时码授时, from the National Time Service Center, Chinese Academy of Sciences

Time signal radio stations
Radio stations established in 2002
2002 establishments in China